Thomas Glynn (died 1648) was a Welsh politician who sat in the House of Commons  variously between 1624 and 1640. He supported the Parliamentary side in the English Civil War.

Glynn was the son of Sir William Glynn of Glynllifon and his wife Jane Griffith, daughter of John Griffith (of Plas Mawr), Caernarvonshire. He was the brother of John who also became an MP and a judge.

In 1622 Glynn served as High Sheriff of Caernarvonshire and in 1624 was then elected Member of Parliament for Caernarvonshire and was re-elected in 1625. In April 1640, he was again elected MP for Caernarvonshire in the Short Parliament. In the Civil War he supported the parliamentary side and was made governor of Caernarvon Castle after its surrender in 1646.
 
Glynn died in 1648. He was succeeded at Glynllifon by his son John.

References

 

Year of birth missing
1648 deaths
Members of the Parliament of England (pre-1707) for constituencies in Wales
High Sheriffs of Caernarvonshire
English MPs 1624–1625
English MPs 1625
English MPs 1640 (April)